Seidenfeld is a surname. Notable people with the surname include: 

Ian Seidenfeld (born 2001), American para table tennis player
Mark Seidenfeld, American legal academic
Mitchell Seidenfeld (born 1963), American para table tennis player
Teddy Seidenfeld, American statistician and philosopher